Prodontocharax is a genus of characins found in tropical South America, with three currently described species:
 Prodontocharax alleni J. E. Böhlke, 1953
 Prodontocharax howesi (Fowler, 1940)
 Prodontocharax melanotus N. E. Pearson, 1924

References
 

Characidae
Fish of South America